The 2017–18 Macedonian First League was the 26th season of the Macedonian First League, with 12 teams participating in it. The season started in November 2017 and ended May 2018. Rabotnički achieved their fifteenth title after defeating MZT Skopje in the finals, that won the six previous championships.

Competition format
The twelve teams that compose the league played a double-legged round robin tournament, where the six first qualified teams joined the Super League and the other six fought for avoiding the relegation.

The top four teams of the Super League qualified for the playoffs for the title.

Teams 

Gostivar replaced Vardar, who was relegated from the previous season. As a result of an expansion of the league to 12 teams, Blokotehna and Skhupi were also promoted.

Regular season

Standings

Second stage

Super League

Relegation group

Playoffs
Playoffs will be played with a best-of-five games format, where the seeded team played games 1, 2 and 5 at home.

References

External links
 Macedonian First League website
 Macedonian First League at Eurobasket.com

Macedonian First League (basketball) seasons
Macedonian
Basketball